Maysky is a town and the administrative center of Maysky District of the Kabardino-Balkarian Republic, Russia, located  northeast of Nalchik, the capital of the republic. Population:

History
A Russian military outpost of Prishib was founded in 1824. It was re-organized as the stanitsa of Prishibskaya in 1829. In 1920, that settlement was renamed Prishibsky, in 1925—Maysky. In 1959, the settlement and the stanitsa were merged into the urban-type settlement of Maysky, which was granted town status in 1965.

Administrative and municipal status
Within the framework of administrative divisions, Maysky serves as the administrative center of Maysky District, to which it is directly subordinated. As a municipal division, the town of Maysky, together with five rural localities, is incorporated within Maysky Municipal District as Maysky Urban Settlement.

Demographics
Population:

Ethnic composition
As of the 2002 Census, the ethnic distribution of the population was:
Russians: 74.2%
Turks: 7.8%
Koreans: 3.8%
Kabardins: 3.7%
Ukrainians: 2.0%
Other ethnicities: 8.5%

References

Notes

Sources

Cities and towns in Kabardino-Balkaria